Ashvin Krishna Dwarka, most commonly known as Ashvin Dwarka (born 1977), is a Mauritian writer and notary.

Early life
Ashvin Dwarka was born in the town of Quatre Bornes on the island of Mauritius. He completed his secondary education at Royal College Curepipe before travelling to France and England where he studied law and taxation. He then worked in France until 2005 before returning to Mauritius in 2006.

Recognition
In 2013 Dwarka was awarded the Jean Fanchette Prize for his novel "Le Neuvième Passage".

Works
 Le Neuvième Passage
 Les Agneaux de Dieu
 The Lawyer’s Confession

References

External links 
 Biography of Ashvin Dwarka.

1977 births
Living people
Mauritian novelists
Mauritian poets
20th-century Mauritian writers
21st-century Mauritian writers